"The Special Two" is a song by Australian singer-songwriter Missy Higgins and the third single released from her debut album, The Sound of White. The song was also included on her 2003 debut EP, The Missy Higgins EP, although re-recorded for the studio album. Higgins said of the lyrics, "Basically I made a big mistake [...] I fell into a lump of depression, locking myself out the back in the bungalow. After a couple of days I came up with the song. I played it to that person and it was therapeutic. It was a good sorry letter." In June 2018, Higgins revealed in The Weekend Age that the song was an apology to her older sister, who also liked a boy that she liked but ended up going out with Higgins.

The single was released in Australia on 4 April 2005 as The Special Two EP. It entered the ARIA Singles Chart at number two, behind Jesse McCartney's "Beautiful Soul". "The Special Two" sold over 35,000 copies in Australia, earning a gold certification from the ARIA. One of the B-sides featured with the single is a cover of the Skyhooks song "You Just Like Me Cause I'm Good in Bed". Higgins invited her sister to the concert when she first played it 'for someone in the crowd tonight', and her sister cried.

Awards and nominations

Nominations
 2005 ARIA Awards, Single of the Year
 2005 ARIA Awards, Highest Selling Single

Track listing
Australian CD single
 "The Special Two" – 4:26
 "Drop the Mirror" – 4:35
 "Blind Winter" – 3:19
 "You Just Like Me Cause I'm Good in Bed" – 2:45

Charts

Weekly charts

Year-end charts

Certifications

References

External links
 Missy Higgins web page

2003 songs
2005 singles
Eleven: A Music Company singles
Missy Higgins songs
Song recordings produced by Mitchell Froom
Songs written by Missy Higgins